Kleinová is a family name.  Notable persons with Kleinová as a surname include:

Eliška Kleinová (born Elisabeth "Lisa" Klein), Czech Jewish pianist, music educator, and sister of Gideon Klein
Gertrude "Traute" Kleinová, Czech 2-time table tennis world champion
Ivana Kubešová, née Kleinová, Czech middle-distance runner
Sandra Kleinová, Czech tennis player

See also 
Klein (surname)
 Kline (surname)
 Cline (surname)
 Clyne (surname)
 Little (surname)

Jewish surnames